Heavy Runner Mountain is located in the Lewis Range, Glacier National Park in the U.S. state of Montana. The summit is a little over a mile east-northeast of Reynolds Mountain and is easily seen from the Going-to-the-Sun Road as well as Logan Pass. The mountain is named for the Blackfeet Indian Chief, Heavy Runner, who was massacred along with most of his encampment by Col. Eugene M. Baker's detachment on the Marias River on January 23, 1870.

Climate

Based on the Köppen climate classification, Heavy Runner Mountain is located in a subarctic climate characterized by long, usually very cold winters, and short, cool to mild summers. Temperatures can drop below −10 °F with wind chill factors below −30 °F.

Geology

Like other mountains in Glacier National Park, Heavy Runner Mountain is composed of sedimentary rock laid down during the Precambrian to Jurassic periods.

See also
 List of mountains and mountain ranges of Glacier National Park (U.S.)
 Geology of the Rocky Mountains

References

Gallery

External links
 Weather forecast: Heavy Runner Mountain

Mountains of Glacier County, Montana
Mountains of Glacier National Park (U.S.)
Lewis Range